The Imperial Austrian Exhibition world's fair was held at Earl's Court in London in 1906. It opened on 20 June and closed on 6 October.

Exhibitions and attractions
Three aspects of Austrian society were explored in different themed areas:
 There was a "Tyrolean Village" with lacemakers, woodcarvers, beer halls and cafes
 A model underground salt mine reached by a slide
 A Bohemia area opened by the Bohemian revivalist Count Lützow

Exhibitors included the photographer Josef Jindřich Šechtl, and the bronze goods manufacturer Kalmar who won a bronze prize. There was also an Austrian restaurant.

It was demolished in 1907.

See also
 General Land Centennial Exhibition (1891)
 Franco-British Exhibition (1908)
 Japan–British Exhibition (1910)

References

1906 in London
World's fairs in London
1906 in international relations
Foreign relations of Austria-Hungary
History of the Royal Borough of Kensington and Chelsea
20th century in the Royal Borough of Kensington and Chelsea